Andy Hawkins is a British musician and record producer, based in Leeds in the UK.

He was the bassist in the pop punk band Midget (1996–2001), and now works in Leeds as a producer and live sound engineer, based at The Nave Studios.

He has worked with artists such as The Damned, The Twang, Maxïmo Park, Blood Red Shoes, Eureka Machines, Chris Catalyst, Black Moth, Austin Gold, Hyena Kill, Grave Lines, Sugarhorse, Sounds of Swami, The Human Project, Burning Codes, Janus Stark, Eat Defeat, The Candle Thieves, Random Hand, Hawk Eyes, Agnostic Front, The Dickies, Flogging Molly, Sugarcult, Motion City Soundtrack, Matchbook Romance, The Pigeon Detectives, Ginger of The Wildhearts, No Nothings, The Hubbards, Jellicoe, Nick Corney & The Buzz Rats.

References

1977 births
English record producers
English rock bass guitarists
English audio engineers
Mixing engineers
Living people
Place of birth missing (living people)
21st-century bass guitarists